The 1999 Crown Prince Cup was the 24th season of the Saudi premier football knockout tournament since its establishment in 1957. The main competition started on 14 March and concluded with the final on 16 April 1999.

Al-Ahli were the defending champions; however, they were eliminated in the Round of 16 by Al-Hilal. 

In the final, Al-Shabab defeated Al-Hilal 1–0 to secure their third title. The final was held at the Youth Welfare Stadium in Dammam for the first time. As winners of the tournament, Al-Shabab qualified for the 2000–01 Asian Cup Winners' Cup. As runners-up, Al-Hilal qualified for the 2000 Arab Cup Winners' Cup.

Qualifying rounds
All of the competing teams that are not members of the Premier League competed in the qualifying rounds to secure one of 4 available places in the Round of 16. First Division sides Al-Qadisiyah, Al-Taawoun, Al-Tai and Ohod qualified.

Bracket

Round of 16
The draw for the Round of 16 was held on 9 March 1999. The Round of 16 fixtures were played on 14 and 15 March 1999. All times are local, AST (UTC+3).

Quarter-finals
The draw for the Quarter-finals was held on 20 March 1999. The Quarter-finals fixtures were played on 1 and 2 April 1999. All times are local, AST (UTC+3).

Semi-finals
The draw for the Semi-finals was held on 3 April 1999. The Semi-finals fixtures were played on 7 and 8 April 1999. All times are local, AST (UTC+3).

Final
The 1999 Crown Prince Cup Final was played on 16 April 1999 at the Youth Welfare Stadium in Dammam between Al-Hilal and Al-Shabab. This was the first Crown Prince Cup final to be held at the stadium. This was the first meeting between these two sides in the final. This was Al-Shabab's fifth final and Al-Hilal's third final. All times are local, AST (UTC+3).

Top goalscorers

References
 Football competitions in Saudi Arabia 1998/99
 goalzz

Saudi Crown Prince Cup seasons
1999 domestic association football cups
Crown Prince Cup